Alaigal Oivathillai is a 1981 Indian Tamil-language romance film written and directed by Bharathiraja, from a story by Manivannan. The film stars two new debutants Karthik and Radha, while Thiagarajan, Silk Smitha and Kamala Kamesh appear in supporting roles. It follows Vichu (played by Karthik), a  Hindu Brahmin boy, who falls in love with Mary (played by Radha), a Christian girl. How the lovers unite braving all the obstacles, forms the crux of the story.

The story and screenplay were written by Manivannan and Bharathiraja, respectively. Bharathiraja provided the voice-over for Thiagarajan, while Karthik's voice was dubbed by S. N. Surendar and Radha's voice was dubbed by Anuradha. The cinematography was handled by B. Kannan, and editing was handled by R. Bhaskaran. The music was composed by Ilaiyaraaja. The film was simultaneously shot along with its Telugu version titled Seethakoka Chilaka (1981) where Karthik reprised his role (marking his debut in both the language versions).

Alaigal Oivathillai was released on 18 July 1981 to majorly positive reviews and became a blockbuster. The film received eight Tamil Nadu State Film Awards and went on to become a cult film in later years. It was also remade by Bharathiraja in Hindi as Lovers in 1983.

Plot 
Vichu, a laidback teenager from an orthodox Brahmin family, lives with his widowed mother, a music teacher, in a coastal village. Mary, a modernised Christian girl studying in a nearby town, returns to the village after finishing her examinations, where her wealthy brother David lives with his wife Elissy. David is ruthless, arrogant and feared by the villagers. However, he is extremely protective of his sister. Once when she sings with her friends, Vichu and his friends mock her singing skills. Feeling insulted, she decides to learn singing, obtains permission from David and enrolls in music classes under Vichu's mother.

Mary soon excels and gets the appreciation of Vichu's mother. Vichu gets impressed with Mary's perseverance and when she sings a song exceedingly well, he loses his heart to her. He starts chasing her and expresses his love. Mary, however, avoids him and goes to the extent of slapping him. But the same anger turns into love when she realises his true love for her.

The relationship between Vichu and Mary grows and they become very close to each other without their families knowing. Two children playing on the beach see Vichu and Mary romancing; one of them informs her mother, who in turn informs Elissy about their affair. Elissy berates Mary for courting a non-Christian and warns her of the consequences, should David learn. Elissy prevents Mary from leaving her house, instead arranging for Vichu's mother to teach her there. Vichu and Mary start exchanging messages written on paper pieces tucked in the harmonium. Despite Elissy's control, Mary manages to meet Vichu. Vichu's mother accidentally sees a note in the harmonium and cautions Vichu. However, he explains his true love and seeks her support.

Mary gets admission in a city college, but her love for Vichu prompts her to adopt ingenious techniques to fall ill to enable her to get excuses to cancel the trip. Vichu's friends say the best way to resolve the matter is by proposing formally. Vichu and his friends visit David at his house and propose Vichu's marriage with Mary; David angrily refuses, beats Mary and berates Elissy for being irresponsible. He then locks up Mary and vows to stop her love affair with Vichu.

During the course of events, David gets aroused by his servant's wife undressing, enters the servants' bathroom and rapes her. Elissy who sees the whole thing is too afraid to stop David and she frantically tries to diverts the servant's attention to avoid exposing David and thereby shaming her family. Though he is caught in the act, David cleanly gets away due to his clout, and the servant and his wife, quietly leave the house without making a scene, after making a sarcastic comment to David that he had already 'repaid' them for their loyalty-- and Elissy--rather than they-- should be given the final payment for coolie services rendered, for standing 'guard' so faithfully during the shameful act.

Hurt by the barbed comment but knowing she did wrong and enraged at David's lack of remorse and callousness when she confronted him about the rape, Elissy now turns against David. She decides to help Mary, who truly loves Vichu and assists Mary to meet Vichu secretly. David, who comes to know of this, decides to get Mary married to a relative in a hurry. The priest at the local church meets David and advises him to understand true love and support the young lovers, but David disagrees as he feels religion is more important than emotions. Elissy is against his plan, and advises Mary to meet Vichu and decide their future.

Mary and Vichu decide not to run away, but to live in the same village. When they are together, David lands up, beats Vichu and his friends, takes Mary away and speeds up the process of her forced marriage. When Mary is determined to marry Vichu, Elissy takes her to Vichu's house and hands her over to his mother. Though Vichu's mother is apprehensive, she does not wish to abort their love and accepts Mary. However, David and his people arrive; Vichu's mother asks him and Mary to run away to a safer place. They both run away but remain at the beach. The night passes with protection from their friends. David meets the villagers and provokes them for allowing a Hindu to elope with a Christian. All the villagers join him and come to attack the lovers the next morning.

Vichu and Mary notice the armed crowds coming and decide to face them. An armed David comes to attack Vichu, but is stopped by the priest who advises David to be a human and respect love. David insists that as a true Christian he will not allow Mary to marry someone of a different religion as long as she is Christian. In response, Vichu and Mary renounce their respective religions, much to the shock of David and the villagers, then walk away. Vichu's friends celebrate the lovers' new found happiness and peace.

Cast 
 Karthik as Vichu
Radha as Mary
 Thiagarajan as David
Deepak as Gopal
Yunes
Ranga
Ramesh
Purushothaman
Silk Smitha as Elissy
Kamala Kamesh as Vichu's mother
Periya Karuppu Thevar as Mari, the servant
 Renu Chandra as the house maid and Mari's wife
Vellai Subbaiah
Suresh Chakravarthy

Production 

Karthik, son of actor Muthuraman, and newcomer Radha made their acting debuts with this film. When Muthuraman asked Karthik if he would accept the film, Karthik readily agreed without giving it a second thought. Suresh was initially approached for the lead role but he opted to do Panneer Pushpangal. Bharathiraja had also contemplated casting Deepak, a Don Bosco student as well as Murali in the lead role, but ultimately did not do so. Thiagarajan, who was then working as regional manager of Polydor, made his acting debut with the film. None of the three actors recorded their dialogues in their own voices; Karthik's voice was dubbed by S. N. Surendar, Radha's by Anuradha and Thiagarajan's by Bharathiraja.

Alaigal Oivathillai is the first film produced by R. D. Bhaskar through the company Pavalar Creations. The film was shot entirely in Kanyakumari. For the song "Aayiram Thamarai", Bharathiraja wanted a set with swaying lotuses, for which assistant directors Manobala and Manivannan "ran from pillar to post to get it ready". According to Manobala, "We peeled off a plantain sheath and stuck lotus stems to it. Then, both of us raised and swayed the lotus flowers from underwater".

Soundtrack 
The soundtrack album and background score are composed by Ilaiyaraaja. Vairamuthu wrote the lyrics for the songs "Aayiram Thamarai", "Kadhal Oviyam" and "Vizhiyil Vizhundhu" and Gangai Amaran did the same for "Putham Pudhu Kaalai" and "Vaadi En Kappa Kelange". The rest of the songs were written by Ilaiyaraaja.

The song "Putham Pudhu Kaalai" was originally recorded for a film titled Maruthani to be directed by Mahendran. As that film was shelved, the song was included on the LP records of Alaigal Oivathillai, but it was not featured in the film itself. It was later remastered for Megha (2014), in which Ilayaraaja was also the composer. The song was also reused as "Halke Se Bole" in the Hindi film Paa (2009).

The song "Kadhal Oviyam" was reused as "Meri Zindagi" in Hindi film Aur Ek Prem Kahani (1996), which is also composed by Ilayaraaja. The song "Aayiram Thamarai" was reused in Vaigai (2009). The song "Vaadi En Kappa Kelange" was remixed by Dhina in Sandai (2008).

The song "Vizhiyil Vizhundhu" was composed within 10 minutes while other songs were composed within half an hour.

Release and reception 
Alaigal Oivathillai was released on 18 July 1981. In a review dated 2 August 1981, the Tamil magazine Ananda Vikatan rated the film 50 out of 100. The then chief minister M. G. Ramachandran applauded the performance of Smitha, and encouraged her to perform more similar roles.

Accolades 
Tamil Nadu State Film Awards
 Best Film (first prize) – R. D. Bhaskar
 Best Director – Bharathiraja
 Best Music Director – Ilaiyaraaja
 Best Lyricist – Vairamuthu
 Best Cinematographer – B. Kannan
 Best Story Writer – Manivannan
 Best Debut Actor (Male) – Karthik
 Best Debut Actor (Female) – Radha

Other versions 
Alaigal Oivathillai was simultaneously shot along with its Telugu version titled Seethakoka Chilaka by Bharathiraja himself with Karthik reprising his role, which was released one month later. Bharathiraja remade it in Hindi as Lovers in 1983.

References

Bibliography

External links 
 

1980s Tamil-language films
1981 films
1981 romantic drama films
Films directed by Bharathiraja
Films scored by Ilaiyaraaja
Indian interfaith romance films
Indian romantic drama films
Tamil films remade in other languages